Barbara Orzechowska-Ryszel (29 August 1931 – 16 October 2015) was a Polish fencer. She competed in the women's team foil event at the 1960 Summer Olympics. In 1956 and 1960 she was the Polish women's individual champion.

References

External links
 

1931 births
2015 deaths
Polish female foil fencers
Olympic fencers of Poland
Fencers at the 1960 Summer Olympics
Fencers from Warsaw
20th-century Polish people
21st-century Polish people